Hanieh Tavassoli (born June 4, 1979) is an Iranian actress. She has received various accolades, including a Crystal Simorgh and an Iran Cinema Celebration Award, in addition to nominations for five Hafez Awards and an Iran's Film Critics and Writers Association Award.

Early life 
Hanieh is a Persian name said to mean joy. Her father Nader died in 1999.

Filmography

Film

Web

Television

Theatre

Awards and nominations

See also 
 Iranian women
 Iranian cinema
 List of famous Persian women

References

External links
 

 Ehsān Rahim'zādeh, Hezār Rāh-e Narafteh: Negāhi Be Parvandeh-e Bāzigari-e Hāni'eh Tavassoli (A Thousand Unattempted Ways: Exploring the Acting Dossier of Hāni'eh Tavassoli), Saturday 27 Khordād 1385 AH (17 June 2006), Cinemā-e Mā.  
 Hāni'eh Tavassoli, Iranactor.com.  
 Hanieh Tavassoli Biography. WhatsUpIran.com.  3 March 2012.

Iranian film actresses
People from Hamadan
1979 births
Living people
Islamic Azad University, Central Tehran Branch alumni
Crystal Simorgh for Best Actress winners